The 1979/80 NTFL season was the 59th season of the Northern Territory Football League (NTFL).

Darwin Buffaloes have won their 21st premiership title while defeating the Nth. Darwin (Palmerston) Magpies in the grand final by 37 points.

Grand Final

References

Northern Territory Football League seasons
NTFL